Line 10 of the Guangzhou Metro is a rapid transit rail line currently under construction in Guangzhou. Line 10 will incorporate Line 3's spur line into Line 10 once it becomes operational. Line 10 will connect Tianhe with Liwan via Haizhu. Line 10 mainly runs parallel in-between Line 2 and Line 3 in Haizhu. Line 10 has been under construction since January 2018.

Station

References

10